Limnocottus bergianus is a species of ray-finned fish belonging to the family Cottidae, the typical sculpins. It was described by Dmitrii Nikolaevich Taliev in 1935. It is a freshwater fish which is endemic to Lake Baikal, Russia. It is known to dwell at a depth range of 100–1000 metres. Males can reach a maximum total length of 22.5 centimetres.

L. bergianus feeds primarily on bony fish and gammarids.

References

bergianus
Fish described in 1935
Taxa named by Dmitrii Nikolaevich Taliev
Fish of Lake Baikal